Yegindybulak (Egindibulaq) is a settlement in Karkaraly District, Karaganda Region, Kazakhstan. It is the administrative center of the Yegindybulak Rural District (KATO code - 354851100). Population:

History
The Koyandy Fair, a large annual trade fair held every June from 1848 to 1930, was located near modern day Yegindybulak on the caravan route from Central Asia to Siberia. Yegindybulak was the administrative center of Kazybekbi District, an administrative division of the Karaganda Region from 1928 to 1963 and again between 1964 and 1997.

Geography
Yegindybulak is located on a dry steppe area at the feet of Mount Ku. The terrain to the north of the town is mountainous. Nearby settlements include Karabulak (west southwest), Terekti (northwest), Osibay (northeast), and Kiikqashqan and Dogalan (southeast).

References

External links

Populated places in Karaganda Region